Belfast International Airport  is an airport  northwest of Belfast in Northern Ireland, is the main airport for the city of Belfast. Until 1983, it was known as Aldergrove Airport, after the nearby village of Aldergrove. In 2018, over 6.2 million passengers travelled through the airport, a 7.4% increase compared with 2017. The majority of flights from Belfast International are operated by easyJet, Northern Ireland's biggest airline. It features flights to some European metropolitan and several leisure destinations.

Belfast International has a CAA Public Use Aerodrome Licence that allows flights for the public transport of passengers or for flying instruction. The airfield was previously shared with the Royal Air Force base RAF Aldergrove, which closed in 2008. The base is now known as Joint Helicopter Command Flying Station, Aldergrove, and both runways are now owned by the airport. The airport is owned and operated by VINCI Airports which was previously owned by ADC & HAS.

History

1917–1945
 

The airport lies within the parish of Killead, between the small villages of Killead (to the east) and Aldergrove (to the west). The site for the airport was established in 1917, when it was selected to be a Royal Flying Corps training establishment during the First World War. The airport remained open at the end of the war for RAF activity.

Civil traffic began in 1922, when flights were conducted to fly newspapers from Chester. The first scheduled passenger service was started in 1933 by the Scottish airline Midland & Scottish Air Ferries. This service consisted of two daily flights each way between Aldergrove and Renfrew Airport, Glasgow. This was subsequently augmented by a twice-daily, return service to Croydon, at that time London's airport, with stops at the Isle of Man, Liverpool and Birmingham.

During the Second World War, Aldergrove remained an RAF station particularly for the Coastal Command. So that the airport could accommodate larger, long-range aircraft, a major works programme was undertaken to replace the four existing runways with two new long paved runways, thereby forming the basis of the layout that still exists at the airport today.

1946–1970
One of the outcomes of the wartime airfield construction programme was the building of Nutts Corner Airport, just  from Aldergrove. On 1 December 1946, the new site replaced Belfast Harbour Airport (now George Best Belfast City Airport) as Northern Ireland's civil airport, as the Harbour Airport was considered unsuitable.

By the 1950s civil air traffic had outstripped the facilities at Nutts Corner and, in addition, aircraft were being regularly diverted to Aldergrove because of adverse weather conditions. In July 1959 the decision was made to move civil flights to Aldergrove to take advantage of the large airfield and this took place in October 1963.

A new terminal and apron were built, with the necessary passenger facilities, and the complex was opened by Queen Elizabeth, The Queen Mother on 28 October 1963. The first regular jet service to London–Gatwick started in 1966, and in 1968 Aer Lingus and BOAC introduced scheduled services to New York City via Shannon and Glasgow-Prestwick respectively.

1971–1999
In 1971, Northern Ireland Airports Limited was formed to operate and develop the airport and its facilities. A major programme of airfield upgrades was undertaken, resulting in improvements to runways, taxiways and the parking apron.

A new International Pier was built together with lounge facilities and car parks, while an additional apron was provided to separate the smaller general aviation aircraft from large commercial jets. In the meantime, British Airways launched the first Belfast to Heathrow shuttle service and the first Boeing 747 operated from the airport on a charter service to Toronto via Shannon. The first scheduled service to a European city was started by NLM Cityhopper (now KLM Cityhopper) flying to Amsterdam.

In 1983 the airport, renamed Belfast International, was regularly accommodating the largest civil aircraft in service and with the installation of new technology was capable of all-weather operations. In 1985 passenger numbers reached 1.5 million and BMI went into competition with British Airways on the Heathrow service. Further developments to the terminal occurred throughout the late 1980s and early 1990s, extending the terminal's landside and airside area. A new Executive Aviation Terminal was also opened in 1987 and the new cargo centre opened in 1991.

The airport was privatised in 1994. TBI became the new owner of the airport on 13 August 1996, by which time annual passenger numbers had reached 2.5 million.

In 1998, easyJet started operations from the airport with flights to London Luton. Since then the airline has established a large base at Belfast International and a further twelve domestic routes and twenty-three direct European scheduled routes have been added to the network, making the airline the largest user of the airport.

Development since the 2000s

In 2005, Continental Airlines launched the first ever nonstop scheduled service to Newark; this continued to operate under the United Airlines brand until its termination in January 2017.

In July 2013, it was confirmed that abertis would sell Belfast International Airport, Stockholm Skavsta Airport & Orlando Sanford International Airport to ADC & HAS based in the United States. In February 2015 the airport re-opened the viewing gallery that had been closed for 10 years which provides a view of the apron and the runways that serve the airport. It also includes live ATC, arrival and departure boards, and a live flight radar screen. However, this was later closed again in October 2019.

Ryanair opened a base at the airport in 2016, initially operating flights to nine destinations. The airline said it would carry 1.1 million passengers a year out of the airport. In 2017 and 2018, Norwegian Air Shuttle operated long-haul services to Newburgh and Providence.

In April 2018, Vinci Airports, a subsidiary of Vinci SA, acquired an airport portfolio held by Airports Worldwide (previously named ADC & HAS), with the transaction expected to close later that year, Vinci Airports became the new owner of Belfast International Airport.

Thomas Cook Airlines had a seasonal base at the airport, until their collapse in September 2019. They operated routes to Europe and some other destinations, operated by an Airbus A321 aircraft. Every July, they operated long-haul flights from Belfast to Cancun and Orlando, operated by their Airbus A330 aircraft. In August 2021, Ryanair announced they would be ending its operations at both of Belfast's airports. In July 2022, Ryanair announced that they will be returning to Belfast International Airport, in addition to opening a base.

Airlines and destinations

Passenger

The following airlines operate regular scheduled and charter flights to and from Belfast International:

Cargo

General Aviation
Woodgate Aviation has a base at the airport, featuring a private jet terminal, with facilities to accommodate small aircraft. Woodgate Aviation is Belfast International Airport’s only FBO to provide hangarage. Their 33,000 sq ft hangar was constructed in 2015, and at the time of completion, access to hangar floor was through Europe’s largest hydraulic door. 

Belfast International Airport welcomed Global Trek Aviation, as the third FBO on the airfield, during 2015. This was part of the Airports commercial drive to develop the non-scheduled, Military and GA development at the airport. This had notable success with an increase in growth across these movement types at Belfast International Airport.

Traffic and statistics

Traffic figures
Belfast International handled over 4.8 million passengers in 2022. The airport's busiest year over operation was in 2019 when it handled over 6.27 million passengers. The airport is the busiest in Northern Ireland and the 10th-busiest airport in the UK by passenger traffic in 2022.

Busiest routes

Transport links

Road
Travellers by car can reach the airport from Belfast via the M2 motorway. The airport operates four car parks, three on-site car parks and one off-site car park. The on-site short-stay and main car parks are situated within easy walking distance of the terminal building, and an on-demand courtesy bus operates to and from the on-site long-stay car park. The off-site short- or long-stay car park, called 'Park and Fly', is located just before the main entrance to the airport, and is also serviced by a courtesy bus.

Bus
Translink operates an express bus service 300 to the airport from its Europa Buscentre in Belfast City Centre. This runs 24 hours a day, every 15 minutes at peak times. Translink also offers bus connections to Antrim railway station. The airport can be reached from Derry and the northwest by the Airporter. The 109A bus service operates between 6am and 6pm from Lisburn bus centre in Lisburn City Centre, calling at Lisburn railway station, Ballinderry, Glenavy, Crumlin, Belfast International Airport, and Antrim Train and Bus Centre Providing connections with Northern Ireland railways to Belfast Great victoria street station and Derry/Londonderry  station.

Train
The nearest railway station is Antrim railway station,  from the airport in Antrim, and serviced by a bus (the 109A Ulsterbus service) to and from Antrim bus/railway station from there connections to Derry and Belfast by train can be made. There are connections to Belfast, Lisburn and Derry. Antrim station is on the Belfast–Derry railway line. Trains to and from Dublin are via Belfast Central railway station. A new station serving the airport could be constructed on the mothballed Lisburn-Antrim railway line, as set out in the airport master plan. This line remains in serviceable condition and passes close to the airport terminal. It has also been listed in a public review of the future of Northern Ireland railways.

Accidents and incidents 
On 24 March 1996, Vickers Viscount G-OPFE of British World Airlines was damaged beyond economic repair when it made a wheels-up landing.
On 23 December 1997, a Maersk Air Boeing 737 aircraft operating for British Airways and with 63 passengers and 6 crew on board was forced to return to the airport after a major failure in the starboard engine. The pilot declared an emergency and the aircraft returned to the airport safely on one engine. It was later found that an engine seal had failed, causing catastrophic engine failure and slight damage to the engine cowling and under-wing surface. The subsequent investigation uncovered design and manufacturing defects with the seals, and led to the incorporation of new design seals in all future engines.
On 31 October 2010, a bomb was found inside a Toyota Carina parked in the long-stay car park; Army bomb disposal experts dismantled it. It is believed that the car and bomb had been in the car park since 2009. It was only discovered when workers were getting ready to tow the vehicle out of the car park. Many passengers had to spend the night in hotels or arrange alternative transport as they were unable to get to their cars.

References

External links

 Official website

Airports in Northern Ireland
Buildings and structures in County Antrim
Transport in Belfast
Airports established in 1917
1917 establishments in Ireland